Michael Stewart Witherell (born 22 September 1949) is an American physicist and laboratory director.  He has been the director of the Lawrence Berkeley National Laboratory since 2016. Witherell, a particle physicist, previously served as Director of Fermilab. He was a particle physicist at the University of California, Santa Barbara and also served as vice chancellor for research there.

Early life and education
He was born 22 September 1949 in Toledo, Ohio. Witherell received a Bachelor of Science from the University of Michigan in 1968 and a Doctor of Philosophy from the  University of Wisconsin, Madison in 1973.

Career
From 1973 to 1981 he was on the faculty of Princeton University.  He was a member of the physics faculty at the University of California, Santa Barbara from 1981 to 1999.

In 1985 Witherell led an experiment at Fermilab which was the first to isolate a large sample of particles containing the charm quark using the new technology of silicon microstrip detectors.  He received the 1990 Panofsky Prize from the American Physical Society for this research. In 1998 he was elected to the National Academy of Sciences.

Witherell served as the Director of the Fermilab from 1999 to 2005. In 2005 he returned to UC Santa Barbara as the Vice Chancellor for Research, serving in that role until 2016.

In January 2016, the University of California Board of Regents appointed him to be the Director of Lawrence Berkeley National Laboratory. In 2017 he was elected to the American Academy of Arts and Sciences.

Service
Witherell chaired the Fermilab Program Advisory Committee from 1987 to 1989 and the SLAC Scientific Policy Committee from 1994 to 1996, and the High Energy Physics Advisory Panel of the United States Department of Energy from 1997 to 1999. He chaired the Mathematical and Physical Sciences Advisory Committee (MPSAC) of the NSF from 2006 to 2008 and the National Academy of Science's Board on Physics and Astronomy from 2015 to 2016.

Personal life
His wife Elizabeth Witherell, a literary historian and scholarly editor, is editor-in-chief of The Writings of Henry D. Thoreau project at UC Santa Barbara.

Awards and honors
1986: elected a Fellow of the American Physical Society
1988: Guggenheim Fellow for the academic year 1988–1989
1990: awarded the Panofsky Prize
1998: elected a member of the National Academy of Sciences
2004: received the Gold Award of the US Secretary of Energy
2017: elected a member of the American Academy of Arts and Sciences

References

External links

 Berkeley Lab Director Michael Witherell
 Witherell's web page at the University of California, Santa Barbara
 Fermi News, March 1999, appointment of Witherell as Director of Fermilab
 Science Blog — Distinguished Physicist Michael Witherell Appointed Director of Fermilab
 with Helen Quinn: The asymmetry between matter and antimatter. Scientific American, October 1998
 Michael S. Witherell's profile and scientific publications on INSPIRE-HEP

1949 births
Living people
University of Michigan alumni
University of Wisconsin–Madison alumni
University of California, Santa Barbara faculty
Fellows of the American Physical Society
Members of the United States National Academy of Sciences
Winners of the Panofsky Prize
21st-century American physicists
Particle physicists
People from Toledo, Ohio
People associated with Fermilab